Asura insularis is a moth of the  family Erebidae. It is found on the Louisiade Archipelago.

References

insularis
Moths described in 1913
Taxa named by Walter Rothschild
Moths of New Guinea